Ryan Maneely (born 19 October 1994) is an English professional rugby league footballer who plays as a  for the Rochdale Hornets in the Betfred Championship.

Maneely has previously played for Saddleworth Rangers and been in the systems of the Warrington Wolves, and spent time on loan at the Swinton Lions and Rochdale Hornets.

In October, Maneely was named in Scotland's 2016 Four Nations squad.

References

External links
Rochdale Hornets profile

1994 births
Living people
English people of Scottish descent
English rugby league players
Halifax R.L.F.C. players
Rochdale Hornets players
Rugby league hookers
Rugby league players from Salford
Scotland national rugby league team players
Swinton Lions players